Halebank is a settlement and civil parish in the Borough of Halton, Liverpool City Region, England. The area locally referred to as Halebank was officially created by the Halton (Parish Electoral Arrangements) Order 2008.  The parish lies in the western part of the town of Widnes.

In the 2011 census Halebank had a population of 1,898.

References

Populated places in Cheshire
Civil parishes in Cheshire
Borough of Halton